Mnesarchaea fusca is a species of primitive moths in the family Mnesarchaeidae. This species was first described by Alfred Philpott in 1922, and is endemic to New Zealand. The larvae of the species is bright green when young but turns a brownish green when mature. Adults of this species are small and dark brown with patches of reddish yellow on its forewings. This species is found in Nelson and Marlborough Sounds. It inhabits poorly lit forest ravines and gullies or areas near shaded waterways. Adults are on the wing between December to February.

Taxonomy 
This species was first described by Alfred Philpott in 1922 and named Mnesarchaea fusca.  The holotype specimen, collected by Philpott at Gouland Downs in what is now known as the Kahurangi National Park in February, is held at the New Zealand Arthropod Collection.

Description

The larva of this species can reach a length of 6 mm and is bright green when young, turning a brownish-green when mature.

Philpott originally described this species as follows:

M. fusca is small and dark brown in colour with patches of ochreous-yellow on its forewings. The maximum length of the forewing is 3.5 mm. The genitalia of M. fusca is quite distinct from similar species such as M. hudsoni and M. fallax.

Distribution 
This species is endemic to New Zealand. It is found in the Nelson and Marlborough Sounds districts. Although initially believed to have also been found in Wellington, those specimens are regarded as being distinct from M. fusca and are identified as M. hudsoni.  This change is based on the significant differences in the genitalia of the two species.

Habitat 
This species inhabits poorly lit forest ravines and gullies or areas near shaded waterways. M. fusca is often collected in the presence of periphyton and can also be found near or on filmy ferns or ferns in the family Balechnaceae.

Behaviour 
The adults of this species are on the wing from December to February.

References

Moths described in 1922
Endemic fauna of New Zealand
Moths of New Zealand
Mnesarchaeoidea
Taxa named by Alfred Philpott
Endemic moths of New Zealand